Thulasi Tharumalingam (born 24 October 1992) is a Qatari boxer of Sri Lankan Tamil descent. He competed in the men's light welterweight event at the 2016 Summer Olympics.

References

External links
 
 
 
 

1992 births
Living people
Qatari male boxers
Olympic boxers of Qatar
Boxers at the 2016 Summer Olympics
People from Osterholz
German people of Sri Lankan Tamil descent
Naturalised citizens of Qatar
Qatari people of Sri Lankan Tamil descent
Boxers at the 2018 Asian Games
Asian Games competitors for Qatar
Light-welterweight boxers